Vicente Cabrera Funes (1944 – 6 July 2014) was a Professor of Spanish at the University of Minnesota Morris and Ecuadorian writer in Morris, Minnesota.

Prof. Cabrera received his B.A. from Pontifical Catholic University of Ecuador - Quito, and his M.A. and Ph.D. from the University of Massachusetts.

Selected works

References

Ecuadorian novelists
1944 births
2014 deaths
Ecuadorian emigrants to the United States
20th-century novelists
Ecuadorian male writers
21st-century novelists
Male novelists
Pontifical Catholic University of Ecuador alumni
Ecuadorian critics
Ecuadorian essayists
20th-century essayists
21st-century essayists
People from Morris, Minnesota
20th-century male writers
21st-century male writers
University of Massachusetts Amherst alumni
University of Minnesota faculty
Writers from Minnesota